Abattoir Blues (American title: In the Dark Places) is the 22nd novel by Canadian detective fiction writer Peter Robinson in the  Inspector Banks series set in Yorkshire. It was published in 2014.

Plot
DCI Banks has been on holiday in Umbria, Italy, meeting his girlfriend Oriana's family. He is due back on Tuesday but calls into work a day early. DC Gerry Masterson says You're a glutton for punishment, sir. When talking to a witness, a retired policeman who says Why keep working any longer than you have to DI Annie Cabott thinks of Banks: They'd have to drag him kicking and screaming out of his office soon. Or would he get a newer, bigger office and an extra five year's grace if he got promoted to Superintendent, as Gervaise had promised last November.

Annie investigates a bloody stolen tractor .... Is this why I put in all those years to make DI But DC Dougal Wilson says it's rural crime ... a major crime .... according to the new police commissioner. And it is worth over a hundred K. Then the crime is linked to a human bloodstain found in a hangar at a disused wartime aerodrome, and ties into a local criminal ring run by the tractor owner who is an ex-City financier. Beddowes is a "hobby" farmer, not a "real" farmer according to the locals.  When a lorry carrying corpses of fallen farm animals for incineration crashes off the isolated Belderfield  Pass, amongst the animal remains there is a dismembered human body, probably that of a missing petty criminal from the criminal ring. So vegetarian DI Annie has to investigate the local (legitimate) abattoirs.

Richard "Dirty Dick" Burgess helps Banks out in London as "Operation Hawk" is targeting rural crime.  After talking to Burgess who tells him that the London mastermind has "coughed" to save himself, Banks felt defeated then realised that was the way of the world .... there'll always be a Dirty Dick Burgess, but it was a win for them.  And he realised earlier that Burgess was one of his few remaining friends.  Then Banks finds an hours-old note from DS Winsome Jackman saying she is off to the isolated High Point Farm and wants backup. Banks rushes there and is told Winsome has hidden in the Swainsdale cave system; which she knows as she is a keen potholer . She had found an illegal abattoir; the villain chases her but gets stuck in the caves and dies of hypothermia.

External links
Dedicated page on author's website

2014 Canadian novels
Canadian crime novels
Novels by Peter Robinson (novelist)
Novels set in Yorkshire
Hodder & Stoughton books
McClelland & Stewart books